Marco Torrieri (born 14 May 1978) is an Italian sprinter who specializes in the 200 metres.

Biography
He finished sixth at the 2002 European Championships in Munich and fifth at the 2003 IAAF World Indoor Championships in Birmingham. At the 2001 Mediterranean Games he finished fourth over 200 m and won a gold medal in 4 x 100 m relay. At the 2005 Mediterranean Games he won a bronze medal in the 100 metres race.

His personal best time is 20.38 seconds, achieved in the semi final at the 2001 World Championships in Edmonton.

National titles
He won 3 national championships at individual senior level.
Italian Athletics Championships
200 metres: 2001
Italian Indoor Athletics Championships
200 metres: 2000, 2003

See also
 Italian all-time lists - 100 metres
 Italian all-time lists - 200 metres
 Italy national relay team

References

External links
 

1978 births
Living people
People from Monterotondo
Italian male sprinters
Athletes (track and field) at the 2004 Summer Olympics
Olympic athletes of Italy
Athletics competitors of Centro Sportivo Aeronautica Militare
Mediterranean Games gold medalists for Italy
Mediterranean Games bronze medalists for Italy
Athletes (track and field) at the 2001 Mediterranean Games
World Athletics Championships athletes for Italy
Mediterranean Games medalists in athletics
Italian Athletics Championships winners
Sportspeople from the Metropolitan City of Rome Capital